Lake Endla is a lake of Estonia located in the Jõgeva County.

See also
List of lakes of Estonia

References

Endla
Jõgeva Parish
Endla